A nine-segment display is a type of display based on nine segments that can be turned on or off according to the graphic pattern to be produced. It is an extension of the more common seven-segment display, having an additional two diagonal or vertical segments (one between the top and the middle, and the other between the bottom and the horizontal segments). It provides an efficient method of displaying alphanumeric characters.

The letters displayed by a nine-segment display are not consistently uppercase or lowercase in shape. A common compromise is to use a lower-case "n" instead of "N". Depending on the design of the display segments, the use of the extra two segments may be avoided whenever possible, as in the Nixxo X-Page "tall" lowercase "r" and "y". Perhaps to avoid this awkward inconsistency, the Scope Geo N8T does not allow the use of uppercase or lowercase versions of the letters "J" (even though it could easily be displayed on a 7-segment display). Some other letters like "K", "Q", "W" (even though this would appear as an upside-down M), and "X", "Y" (even though it could easily be displayed on a 7-segment display), and "Z".

Uses 

In some Soviet digital calculators of the 1970s, such as the Elektronika 4-71b, 9-segment displays were used to provide basic alphanumerics and avoid confusions with representing numbers in Soviet postcodes.

The extra two bars were slanted forward, allowing for an appropriate-looking И, and to differentiate the numeral 3 
from the letter З. The Sharp Compet calculator also uses a 9-segment display, allowing a small range of characters and symbols to be used.

Nine-segment displays are used in many Timex digital watches, and some pagers, such as the Nixxo XPage, the Arch BR502 pager, and the Scope Geo N8T.
They are also used in some Epson Stylus printers, and Newport iSeries digital meters. The display used in the iSeries is unique in that it has a vertical extra segment at top, and a fully backwards-leaning slant for the extra segment at bottom. This allows for a somewhat more natural-appearing R and M.

A nine-segment display has been developed for displaying Bengali and Roman numerals.

See also 

 Seven-segment display
 Eight-segment display
 Fourteen-segment display
 Sixteen-segment display
 Dot matrix display
 Nixie tube display
 Vacuum fluorescent display

References

External links 

 

Display technology